Wendy Anne "Wendel" Meldrum (July 21, 1954 – January 27, 2021) was a Canadian actress best known for her roles as the "low talker" in the 1993 Seinfeld episode "The Puffy Shirt", and as Miss White/Mrs. Heimer on The Wonder Years.

She guest starred in several television series and appeared in a number of feature films and television movies. Her films include Beautiful Dreamers (1990), Why Me? (1990), Diplomatic Immunity (1991) and The Divine Ryans (1999). She wrote the screenplay for the 2005 independent film Cruel But Necessary. She also played the starring role of Betty Munson alongside her real life ex-husband Mark Humphrey and their son Luke Humphrey.

Meldrum received multiple nominations and awards for her performance as Anne Blecher in the Canadian television comedy-drama series Less Than Kind, which finished its four season run on HBO Canada in 2013.

On November 19, 2014 Meldrum appeared on Ken Reid's TV Guidance Counselor podcast. She died after a short illness on January 27, 2021.

Filmography

Film

Television

Awards and nominations

References

External links
Official Wendel Meldrum Site

Film Reference biography
Brain Driving, a humorous film short featuring Meldrum as "Miss Olga Suchadolsky"
Notes from the Undercarriage, a graphic novel by Meldrum as Fern Poppy

1954 births
2021 deaths
Canadian women screenwriters
Canadian television actresses
Canadian film actresses
Best Actress in a Comedy Series Canadian Screen Award winners
Canadian Comedy Award winners
21st-century Canadian women writers
21st-century Canadian screenwriters